Arbeia was a large Roman fort in South Shields, Tyne & Wear, England, now ruined, and which has been partially reconstructed. It was first excavated in the 1870s and all modern buildings on the site were cleared in the 1970s. It is managed by Tyne and Wear Museums as Arbeia Roman Fort and Museum.

Original fort 
The fort stands on the Lawe Top, overlooking the mouth of the River Tyne. Founded in about AD 160, the Roman Fort guarded  the main sea route to Hadrian's Wall. It later became the maritime supply fort for Hadrian's Wall, and contains the only permanent stone-built granaries yet found in Britain. It was occupied until the Romans left Britain in the 5th century.

"Arbeia" means the "fort of the Arab troops" referring to the fact that part of its garrison at one time was a squadron of Mesopotamian boatmen from the Tigris, following Emperor Septimius Severus securing the city of Singara in 197. From archaeological evidence, such as the gravestone of Victor, described below, it is known that a squadron of Spanish cavalry, the First Asturian, was stationed there. It was common for forts to be manned by units originally from elsewhere in the empire, though often enough these would assimilate and end up recruiting locally.

Through the course of history of Arbeia, the fort has had several guises, from a busy cosmopolitan port to being the Roman Emperor Septimius Severus's HQ for a Scottish invasion. It was a huge supply base for the Roman army, having hosted 600 Roman troops, and is said to be the birthplace of the Northumbrian King Oswin.

Museum 
Two monuments in the museum at Arbeia testify to the cosmopolitan nature of its shifting population. One commemorates Regina, a British woman of the Catuvellauni tribe (approximately modern Hertfordshire). She was first the slave, then the freedwoman and wife of Barates, an Arab merchant from Palmyra (now part of Syria) who, evidently missing her greatly, set up a gravestone after she died at the age of 30. (Barates himself is buried at the nearby fort at Corbridge in Northumberland.) The second commemorates Victor, another former slave, freed by Numerianus of the Ala I Asturum, who also arranged his funeral ("piantissime": with all devotion) when Victor died at the age of 20. The stone records that Victor was "of the Moorish nation".

The museum also holds an altarpiece to a previously unknown god and a tablet with the name of the Emperor Severus Alexander (died 235) chiselled off, an example of damnatio memoriae.

Reconstruction 

The West Gate of the fort was reconstructed in 1986 to give an impression of the place. The Reconstruction of the fort has been accomplished using research which was undertaken following excavations, standing where it had originally existed during the Roman occupation of Britain.

A Roman gatehouse, barracks and Commanding Officer's house have been reconstructed on their original foundations.  The gatehouse holds many displays related to the history of the fort, and its upper levels provide an overview of the archaeological site.

External links 

 Arbeia Roman Fort & Museum
 Tyne and Wear Museums
 Roman Britain

References

2nd-century establishments in Roman Britain
Roman fortifications in England
Roman sites in Tyne and Wear
Tyne & Wear Archives & Museums
Museums of ancient Rome in the United Kingdom
Military and war museums in England
Archaeological museums in England
South Shields
Reconstructions of Roman sites